Geleen is a city in the southern part of the province of Limburg in the Netherlands. With 31,670 inhabitants in 2020, it is part of the municipality of Sittard-Geleen. Geleen is situated along the river Geleenbeek, a right tributary to the river Meuse. The Latin name for Geleenbeek is Glana, meaning "clear river". The town centre is situated at about 60 m above sea level.

History
Until the end of the 19th century, Geleen was a very small village. Its population was 2,545 in 1899. The remains of one of the oldest prehistoric farms in the Netherlands were found here. In the 20th century the exploitation of coal mines in this area (the state-owned coal mine "Maurits", the biggest in Europe, was located in Geleen) brought a fast population increase. During the 1960s and 1970s the Dutch coal mines, which were all located in this part of the province, were closed. The state mining company DSM (privatised in 1989) remained active in Geleen, however, now purely as a chemicals producer. In July 2002, part of DSM's petrochemicals business, located on the manufacturing locations in Geleen and Gelsenkirchen (Germany) were acquired by SABIC Europe.

Sports and events
 The soccer club Fortuna '54, was the former soccer club of Geleen.
 Geleen has a professional ice hockey team called the Geleen Eaters.
 The handball club Vlug en Lenig is from Geleen.
 The pop and rock festival Pinkpop, the oldest and longest running annual dedicated pop and rock music festival in the world, also has its roots in Geleen. It was held there from 1970 until 1986. This festival was held in the Burgemeester Damen Sportpark, which includes the sports centre Glanerbrook. The nearby swimming pool was popular with the artists, who enjoyed themselves backstage.
 In Geleen there's a yearly town fair (one week after Whitsun).
 Stage 5 of Eneco Tour of Benelux a road bicycle racing and part of the UCI ProTour finished in Geleen on August 16, 2013.

Places of interest

 Ruins of Jansgeleen Castle, with restored outer bailey and water mill (Sint-)Jansmolen, to the south-east of Geleen, on the territory of the municipality of Beek.
 Sint-Janskluis, former hermitage from 1699.
 De Biesenhof, recently restored historical farmhouse.
 Parish church Sint Marcellinus and Petrus of Oud-Geleen.
 Drossaerdhuis at Geenstraat.
 Monument at Geenstraat (near train station Geleen-Lutterade) in memory of the martyr sister Aloysia, the Jewish-Catholic Louise Löwenfels.
 Main building of Staatsmijn Maurits.
 Restored former brickyard Plinthos, the present office of park De Graven, at Daniken (near train station Geleen-Oost).
 Foroxity cinema: the largest cinema in Limburg.
 Zuyderland Medical Centrum: a fairly recent hospital with modern architecture.
 Burgemeester Damen Sportpark, the location of the Pinkpop Festival from 1970 to 1986.

Transportation
Geleen is served by two railway stations: Geleen-Lutterade, on the line Sittard-Maastricht, and Geleen Oost, on the line Sittard-Heerlen.

Geleen is also served by two motorways: A2 Amsterdam-Maastricht, exit Urmond, and A76 Antwerp-Aachen, exit Geleen.

Notable people 
 Jasper Adams (born 1989), Dutch handball player
 Benjamin van den Broek (born 1987), Dutch-born New Zealand footballer
 Charles of Mount Argus (1821–1893), Dutch Passionist priest and Saint
 Rick Geenen (born 1988), Dutch footballer
 Myrthe Hilkens (born 1979), Dutch journalist, non-fiction writer and politician
 Wil Jacobs (born 1960), Dutch handball player
 Pierre Kerkhoffs (1936–2021), Dutch footballer
 Paul Kusters (born 1966), Dutch cartoonist
 Paul van Loon (born 1955), Dutch children's author
 Jean Nelissen (1936–2010), Dutch sports journalist
 Maartje Paumen (born 1985), Dutch field hockey player
 Gabriëlle Popken (born 1983), Dutch politician
 Roel Rothkrans (born 1979), Dutch handball player
 Ton Raven (born 1957), Dutch politician
 Pim Rietbroek (born 1942), Dutch handball player and coach
 René Shuman (born 1967), Dutch singer
 Inger Smits (born 1994), Dutch handball player
 Jorn Smits (born 1992), Dutch handball player
 Kay Smits (born 1997), Dutch handball player
 Henk Steevens (1931–2020), Dutch cyclist

Gallery

References

External links

 
 Official website of Sittard-Geleen

Mining communities in the Netherlands
Municipalities of the Netherlands disestablished in 2001
Former municipalities of Limburg (Netherlands)
Populated places in Limburg (Netherlands)
Sittard-Geleen